Veszprém FC is a Hungarian Association Football Club, founded in 1912 as Vegyész TC. The club played in the Hungarian First League between 1988 and 1993. In 2005, the club disbanded but was re-organized in 2006.

References

Football clubs in Hungary
Association football clubs established in 1912
1912 establishments in Hungary
Veszprém